The 1982–83 season was the 81st in the history of the Western Football League.

The league champions for the fifth time in their history, and the second season in succession, were Bideford. The champions of Division One were Bristol Manor Farm.

Final tables

Premier Division
The Premier Division remained at twenty clubs after Bridgwater Town joined the Southern League, and Mangotsfield United and Welton Rovers were relegated to the First Division. Three clubs joined:

Exmouth Town, runners-up in the First Division.
Plymouth Argyle Reserves, from The Football Combination – returning to the league after leaving in 1932.
Shepton Mallet Town, champions of the First Division.

First Division
The First Division remained at nineteen clubs after Ilminster Town and Torquay United Reserves left the league, and Exmouth Town and Shepton Mallet Town were promoted to the Premier Division. Four new clubs joined:

Bristol City Reserves, returning to the league after leaving in 1965.
Mangotsfield United, relegated from the Premier Division.
Welton Rovers, relegated from the Premier Division.
Weymouth Reserves, returning to the league after leaving in 1970.

References

Western Football League seasons
6